The year 549 BC was a year of the pre-Julian Roman calendar. In the Roman Empire, it was known as year 205 Ab urbe condita. The denomination 549 BC for this year has been used since the early medieval period, when the Anno Domini calendar era became the prevalent method in Europe for naming years.

Events

By place

Persia 
 King Cyrus II (the Great) captures the Median capital of Ecbatana, conquering the nation of Media.

Asia 
 Emperor Suizei dies after a 32-year reign and is succeeded by his son Annei as emperor of Japan.

Births
 Darius I, king of Persia (approximate date)

Deaths
 Suizei, emperor of Japan (b. 632 BC)

References